Tomasz Kupis (born 4 April 1964) is a Polish wrestler. He competed in the men's freestyle 130 kg at the 1992 Summer Olympics.

References

1964 births
Living people
Polish male sport wrestlers
Olympic wrestlers of Poland
Wrestlers at the 1992 Summer Olympics
People from Łęczyca
Sportspeople from Łódź Voivodeship